Honey, I Shrunk the Kids is a 1989 American comic science fiction film. It is the first installment of a film franchise and served as the directorial debut of Joe Johnston. The film stars Rick Moranis, Matt Frewer, Marcia Strassman, and Kristine Sutherland. In the film, a struggling inventor accidentally shrinks his kids, along with the neighbors' kids, down to the size of a quarter-inch. After being accidentally thrown out with the trash, they must work together and venture their way back through a backyard wilderness filled with dangerous insects and man-made hazards.

Honey, I Shrunk the Kids was theatrically released in the United States on June 23, 1989, and distributed by Buena Vista Pictures Distribution. It was an unexpected box office success, grossing $222 million worldwide (equivalent to $ million in ) and becoming the highest-grossing live-action Disney film of all time, a record it held for five years. Its success led to two sequels, beginning with Honey, I Blew Up the Kid in 1992, as well as a television series and several theme-park attractions. An animated short film, Tummy Trouble starring Roger Rabbit, was shown in theatres with the film during its box office run.

Plot

Quirky scientist and inventor Wayne Szalinski has been designing a ray gun machine capable of shrinking and growing objects, but cannot get it to work properly. His obsession with the machine worries his hardworking wife Diane, teenage daughter Amy, and aspiring-inventor son Nick. Next door, Big Russ Thompson, his wife Mae, and their younger son Ron are preparing for a fishing trip. Their elder son, Little Russ, is less than enthusiastic, as his interests often clash with his father's. 

Shortly after Wayne leaves for a conference, Ron accidentally hits a baseball through the Szalinski's attic window and into the machine, turning it on and blocking its targeting laser. Caught by his brother, Ron is forced to confess to the Szalinski kids. Ron and Nick enter the attic to retrieve the ball and clean up the mess, and the activated machine shrinks them. Amy and Little Russ suffer the same fate when they go searching for their siblings.

At his conference, Wayne is laughed off the stage for failing to provide proof that his machine works. He enters the attic upon returning home; the shrunken children try to get his attention, but their voices are only loud enough to be heard by the family dog, Quark. Already frustrated, Wayne discovers the broken window and snaps, repeatedly striking the machine. He sweeps the debris, along with the kids, into a dust pan and trash bag. The four manage to escape, only to discover that the trash bag is now at the curb; they must make their way back home through the Szalinski's overgrown yard. 

Meanwhile, the Thompson and Szalinski parents become uneasy at their children's absence. Mae and Big Russ cancel their fishing trip and file a missing persons report with the police. Wayne eventually pieces together what happened, but accidentally activates some sprinklers while searching the yard. As a result, Amy nearly drowns in a mud puddle, but Little Russ dives in to pull her out and revive her with rescue breaths. Wayne eventually reveals the truth to Diane, and she joins in the search. Later, she convinces Wayne to share the information with the Thompsons, but they remain skeptical.

The kids feast on one of Nick's discarded Oatmeal Creme Pie cookies, and use a crumb to capture a friendly forager ant, naming it "Antie" and riding it toward the house. As night falls, the group takes shelter in a Lego piece. Amy and Little Russ begin to express feelings for one another, and share a kiss. The kids are later attacked by a scorpion, but Antie, at the cost of its own life, helps them to drive the scorpion away. 

The next morning, Nick's friend Tommy arrives to mow the lawn. The kids are forced to seek shelter in an earthworm tunnel, barely escaping the vortex caused by the mower, which Wayne and Diane shut off just in time. The kids hitch a ride on Quark, and enter the house, but Nick falls into Wayne's bowl of Cheerios and is nearly eaten. Quark bites Wayne's ankle to get his attention; Wayne discovers the kids' presence, and works to repair the machine. 

Both families meet in the attic, and the kids use charades to inform Wayne that the baseball blocked the laser, which previously overheated targets and caused them to explode. Wayne corrects the problem, and Big Russ volunteers as a test subject; the test is successful, and he and the kids are later restored to their original sizes.

Months later at Thanksgiving, the Szalinskis and Thompsons have become good friends and are toasting over an enlarged turkey.

Cast

Production
The project was originally brought to Disney Studios by Stuart Gordon and Brian Yuzna. Gordon was hired to direct the film and Yuzna to produce. The film was written as Teeny Weenies by Stuart Gordon, Ed Naha, and Brian Yuzna. Tom Schulman was later added as a screenwriter. Gordon originally prepped the film but had to drop out as director shortly before filming began due to illness. Joe Johnston was brought in to replace him while Penny Finkleman Cox replaced Yuzna as producer.

As the title Teeny Weenies seemed to appeal more to a child demographic, the name was changed to Grounded to appeal to a more mature audience. That name was later rejected in favor of The Big Backyard. Honey, I Shrunk the Kids, based on a line of dialogue from the film, ultimately became its title.

The film was heavily influenced by 1950s fare, such as The Incredible Shrinking Man.

Casting 
Judy Taylor, Mike Fenton, and Lynda Gordon were the casting directors. Before Rick Moranis was cast as Wayne Szalinski, the script was written with Chevy Chase in mind because of his popularity in National Lampoon's Vacation. He was filming the second sequel, National Lampoon's Christmas Vacation, and was too busy to portray Wayne.

John Candy was also considered for the role of Wayne. He declined, but suggested to Johnston that his friend (and costar of SCTV, Little Shop of Horrors and Spaceballs), Rick Moranis, would be a good choice. Marcia Strassman portrays Wayne's wife, Diane, who is having marital troubles with him.

Matt Frewer and Kristine Sutherland portray Russ and Mae Thompson, the Szalinskis' next door neighbors and parents of Russ Jr. and Ron. Russ is very demanding of Russ Jr. and can't understand why he isn't more interested in masculine things such as football and fishing (until the end of the film, when he learns to accept him for who he is). He is dimwitted and clumsy and secretly takes to cigarettes when he is nervous or scared. On the other hand, Mae is a very nice person and friendly with the Szalinskis.

The film needed four teenagers to play the leads. Russ Jr., portrayed by Thomas Wilson Brown, seems to be interested in Amy, and less in football, while Ron, Jared Rushton, appears to be more straightforward and a bully toward Nick, although he warms towards him. Rushton has quoted that he took the role after thinking that the script was "appealing" and he thought his character had progressed throughout the film with his personality.

Amy O'Neill and Robert Oliveri were cast as Amy and Nick Szalinski, Wayne and Diane's kids. Oliveri commented that he was in awe about watching his stunt double do his stunts. He later starred as Kevin Boggs in Tim Burton's Edward Scissorhands. O'Neill thought the film was a fun experience and that doing off-set activities, such as swimming or playing cards, was fun to do with the other younger cast members. She accepted the role because it was a "Disney movie."

Direction
Johnston was selected to direct the film for his directorial debut, having been mostly working on films as an effects illustrator and art director. It was filmed at the backlot of Churubusco Studios in Mexico City. Gregg Fonseca was the production designer and was in charge of managing several different sets for the scenes in it.

Some filming took place in the streets of Mexico City. In the scene where Diane walks out of the mall to the pay phone, a sign says "Beverly Hills Mall", but is in fact Plaza Inn a mall in Mexico City.

Special effects were heavily used for the film, such as the electronically controlled ants and bees. For the most part, the production team tried to use practical effects that would work in camera. For the scene where Wayne lands in the Thompsons' pool, Moranis jumped off a flying board in the form of a teeter-totter on a swing set. A stuntman pushed the board, sending him flying through the air and landing on a mat. Numerous storyboards were used for the film, particularly in the sprinkler and bee scenes. Scale models were also used for the bee scene, with miniature Russ Jr. and Nick plastic figures attached. Forced perspective was used in the giant cookie scene, to make it seem bigger. The child actors were strapped in for the scene with the broom. The bristles were actually pieces of foam that were carved and tied to a rig system.

Reception

Box office
The film opened on June 23, 1989, in 1,371 theatres. It opened at number 2 in the United States behind Batman, with a weekend gross of $14,262,961, Buena Vista's biggest 3-day weekend of all time. It earned $130,724,172 domestic and $92,000,000 in other territories, earning a grand total of $222,724,172. Attached to it was Disney and Amblin Entertainment's first Roger Rabbit short, Tummy Trouble, executively produced by Steven Spielberg, produced by Don Hahn, directed by Rob Minkoff, and also composed by James Horner.

Critical response
On Rotten Tomatoes the film has an approval rating of 78% based on reviews from 36 critics, with an average rating of 6.30/10. The consensus reads, "Even as its special effects take center stage, Honey, I Shrunk the Kids still offers a charming, high-spirited sense of adventure for the whole family." Metacritic gave the film a score of 63 based on 11 reviews, indicating "generally favorable reviews." Audiences polled by CinemaScore gave the film an average grade of "A" on an A+ to F scale.

Caryn James, of The New York Times, gave a positive review, saying: "As sweet, funny, and straightforward as its title." Variety gave another positive review stating, "[It's] in the best tradition of Disney – and even better than that, because it is not so juvenile that adults won't be thoroughly entertained." A rare negative review came from Roger Ebert, of the Chicago Sun-Times, who stated: "The special effects are all there, nicely in place, and the production values are sound, but the movie is dead in the water."

The film was also mentioned in the British sitcom Only Fools and Horses episode titled "Rodney Come Home".

Awards
James Horner won an ASCAP Award for Top Box Office Films and was also nominated for a Saturn Award. The film was also nominated for a Saturn Award for Best Science Fiction Film. Thomas Wilson Brown, Jared Rushton, Robert Oliveri and the Special Effects Crew were also nominated for a Saturn Award. The Special Effects Crew won a BAFTA Award for Best Special Visual Effects. Amy O'Neill and Jared Rushton were each nominated for a Young Artist Award and director Joe Johnston was nominated for a Fantasporto Award.

The film was presented in the 100 Greatest Family Films, in which Amy O'Neill and Thomas Wilson Brown talked about it for MTV.

Soundtrack

After going years unreleased, James Horner's soundtrack to the film was made available by Intrada Records on March 6, 2009. The song that Amy dances to in the kitchen is "Turn It Up" by Nick Kamen, written by Jeffrey Pescetto and Patrick DeRemer.

The soundtrack was limited to a 3,000-copy release. Horner's main title music incorporates cues from the score by Nino Rota from Federico Fellini's film Amarcord (1973) and Raymond Scott’s piece "Powerhouse B" (1937), the latter often referenced in Carl Stalling’s Warner Bros. cartoon scores. Scott's piece was used without payment or credit, leading his estate to threaten legal action against Disney. Disney paid an undisclosed sum in an out-of-court settlement and changed the film's cue sheets to credit Scott. Horner's main title music underscores all the major moments involving Szalinski's technology.

With 15 tracks, Horner produced the record with longtime engineer Simon Rhodes while it was originally performed by the London Symphony Orchestra.

 Track listing
 "Main Title" – 1:59
 "Strange Neighbors" – 1:49
 "Shrunk" – 5:37
 "A New World" – 3:31
 "Scorpion Attack" – 3:34
 "Test Run" – 2:08
 "Flying Szalinski" – 1:59
 "Night Time" – 5:04
 "Watering the Grass" – 4:13
 "Ant Rodeo" – 3:45
 "The Machine Works" – 2:05
 "Lawn Mower" – 5:45
 "Eaten Alive" – 2:44
 "Big Russ Volunteers" – 1:24
 "Thanksgiving Dinner" – 5:27

Sequels

Honey, I Blew Up the Kid
In 1992, Disney released the first sequel, Honey, I Blew Up the Kid, with Moranis, Strassman, O'Neill, and Oliveri reprising their roles as Wayne, Diane, Amy and Nick Szalinski. As the title suggests, Wayne succeeds in enlarging his two-year-old son, Adam, to gigantic proportions as one of his size-changing experiments goes awry.

Disney Parks attraction
A three-dimensional film called Honey, I Shrunk the Audience! complete with physical effects such as wind and water was created as an attraction at Walt Disney World's Epcot in 1994, and later made its way to Disneyland, Tokyo Disneyland, and Disneyland Paris with all four parks featuring the attraction by 1999. The film was a replacement for the Michael Jackson film Captain EO, a musical film  launched in 1986.

The film begins as a mock award show by "The Imagination Institute" that is intended to honor Wayne as "Inventor of the Year." Instead, the audience is "shrunk" and threatened by Quark, Gigabyte (Nick's pet python), Diane, and even Adam, among other thrills. It reprises most of the original cast and adds Eric Idle as the host of the award show.

Honey, I Shrunk the Audience was removed from all four Disney parks over the course of 2010. Disney elected to return Captain EO to all four parks to honor Michael Jackson following his death in 2009.

Honey, We Shrunk Ourselves
In 1997, Disney produced the second sequel, Honey, We Shrunk Ourselves, as a direct to video release. Rick Moranis was the only actor to reprise his role. The characters of Diane and Adam were recast, with Amy and Nick only being briefly mentioned in passing. Many new characters were added, including Wayne's brother Gordon and his family. This time, the parents are shrunk and need to be rescued by their kids.

TV series
The last incarnation of the franchise was the television program Honey, I Shrunk the Kids: The TV Show. Peter Scolari took over as Wayne and Nick and Amy both returned as characters, roughly the same age as in the original film, and played by new actors. Its plots involved other wacky Szalinski inventions (rarely the shrinking machine) that do not work quite as expected and land the family in some type of humorous mixed-up adventure.

Future
On February 21, 2018, it was announced that live-action remakes of several films are in development as exclusive content for Disney+, with one of those named in the announcement as being Honey, I Shrunk the Kids. It was later confirmed that a "legacy-sequel" film titled Shrunk is in development to be released theatrically, with a plot that centers around Nick Szalinski as an adult scientist. Josh Gad will star as Nick in the film. On December 5, 2019, it was reported that Joe Johnston is in talks to return as director. On February 12, 2020, it was reported that Rick Moranis will come out of his long semi-retirement to reprise his role as Wayne Szalinski and that Johnston is now confirmed to direct.

See also
 List of films featuring miniature people

References

External links

 
 
 
 
 
 Interview with writer Ed Naha at Dr. Gore's Funhouse.com

1989 films
1980s adventure films
1980s children's comedy films
1980s science fiction comedy films
American children's comedy films
American science fiction comedy films
1980s English-language films
Films about insects
Films about size change
Films directed by Joe Johnston
Films scored by James Horner
Films using stop-motion animation
Honey, I Shrunk the Kids (franchise) mass media
Walt Disney Pictures films
Warner Bros. films
1989 directorial debut films
1989 comedy films
1980s American films